Ahmed Yasser Elmohamady Abd Elrahman is a Qatari footballer who plays as a central defender for Al-Rayyan.

Personal
Ahmed was born in Doha to an Egyptian family. His father Yasser Elmohamady was a footballer in Egypt during the 1970s. He is the brother of fellow Qatar national team footballers Hussein Yasser and Mohammed Yasser.

Club career

Lekhwiya
Born in Doha, Yasser attended the Aspire Academy in Qatar. In 2011 he joined Lekhwiya SC, and made his senior debut on 8 April of the following year by starting in a 1–1 Qatar Stars League home draw against Al Kharaitiyat SC.

Yasser started to feature more regularly in the following campaigns, being mainly used in the AFC Champions League. He made his debut in the competition on 1 May 2012, starting in a 3–0 away loss against Al-Ahli FC.

On 2 January 2014, while playing for Qatar in the 2014 WAFF Championship, Yasser was suspended by the Qatar Football Association for disciplinary problems. He was suspended from playing for his club until the end of the season, and his wages were held as well.

Cultural Leonesa
On 14 July 2017, Yasser moved to Segunda División side Cultural y Deportiva Leonesa. He made his debut on 10 September, starting in a 4–4 home draw against Real Valladolid.

Yasser scored his first goal abroad on 17 September 2017, netting the winner in a 3–2 home success over SD Huesca.

Vissel Kobe
Yasser was loaned out to J1 League club Vissel Kobe in August 2018.

International career
On 26 March 2013 Yasser made his debut for Qatar, starting in a 2–1 away loss against South Korea. He also featured with the under-23s in the 2016 AFC U-23 Championship, scoring a goal against North Korea on 22 January; it was also his first senior goal.

References

External links

1994 births
Qatari people of Egyptian descent
Qatari expatriate sportspeople in Spain
Living people
People from Doha
Qatari footballers
Association football defenders
Qatar Stars League players
Lekhwiya SC players
Al-Duhail SC players
Al-Rayyan SC players
Segunda División players
Cultural Leonesa footballers
Qatar international footballers
Qatari expatriate footballers
Expatriate footballers in Spain
Aspire Academy (Qatar) players
Naturalised citizens of Qatar
Qatari expatriate sportspeople in Japan
Vissel Kobe players